The Men's Freestyle 68 kg at the 1972 Summer Olympics as part of the wrestling program at the Fairgrounds, Judo and Wrestling Hall. Israeli wrestler Eliezer Halfin was later killed in the Munich massacre.

Medalists

Tournament results 
The competition used a form of negative points tournament, with negative points given for any result short of a fall. Accumulation of 6 negative points eliminated the wrestler. When only two or three wrestlers remain, a special final round is used to determine the order of the medals.

Legend
DNA — Did not appear
TPP — Total penalty points
MPP — Match penalty points

Penalties
0 — Won by Fall, Passivity, Injury and Forfeit
0.5 — Won by Technical Superiority
1 — Won by Points
2 — Draw
2.5 — Draw, Passivity
3 — Lost by Points
3.5 — Lost by Technical Superiority
4 — Lost by Fall, Passivity, Injury and Forfeit

Round 1

Round 2

Round 3

Round 4

Round 5

Final 

Results from the preliminary round are carried forward into the final (shown in yellow).

Final standings 
 
 
 
  and 
 -

References

External links
Official Report

Freestyle 68kg